MOTRIO is the multi-brand workshop label of Renault Group. Present in 22 countries with 2,500 Service Centres worldwide and in 128 countries as a spare parts distributor, it offers a complete range of parts and digital solutions in IAM (Independent Aftermarket), as well as an ecosystem including the TecDoc Inside aftermarket database, Parts-Io digital technical catalogue and Partakus, the marketplace dedicated to garages.

History
MOTRIO was founded in 1998 on the experience of Renault Group with the initial aim of offering high-quality car maintenance and assistance services in France and Italy, thanks to a complete range of spare parts as an alternative to original parts for the Renault vehicles. Since 2003, the brand has expanded its business to become a repair network for multi-brand vehicles, thanks to an extensive catalogue of directly managed parts and products.

Since the end of the 1990s, the brand has implemented its presence on French and Italian soil, in 2000 it entered the German, Spanish and Portuguese markets, and in 2003 it expanded its multi-brand repair network to Argentina and Poland. In the following years, MOTRIO consolidated its market position by expanding the capillarity of its service centres worldwide and its product range. In 2016, it developed the new B2C website 'motrio.fr' to offer customers the possibility of receiving online quotes and directly booking appointments with workshops. In 2018, MOTRIO spare parts were marketed in 50 countries through a car repair network of 1,500 garages spread across 3 continents: Europe, Asia and Africa.

From 2021, the brand is engaged in a development project that aims to quadruple its product range, network presence and digital touch points by 2025.

The MOTRIO Business Unit 

Today the business unit is organised in three pillars: Retail, Distribution and Solutions, closely interlinked to develop the automotive aftermarket and provide garages with the best solutions.

MOTRIO Retail represents the world of points of sale, a strategic sector with 2,500 centres in Europe.

MOTRIO was the protagonist of 6 international trade fairs in 2022, at which it also presented its new logo designed with the aim of strengthening the identity of the brand, the products and the new garage concept.

MOTRIO Distribution is dedicated to spare parts and equipment. By 2022, 5,000 new items were produced, covering 80 per cent of the European vehicle fleet thanks to the introduction of innovative filter, braking, engine lubricant and battery systems, as well as a range of purpose-built tyres.

MOTRIO Solutions develops digital solutions, from video catalogues to end-user services. The Group expanded its offer with Partakus and Parts-Io.

The former, the IAM marketplace present in France, Italy and Spain, is being further developed by the integration of new partners; Parts-Io, on the other hand, is the technical catalogue for all car brands launched in several European countries.

Included in the digital development strategy is Fixter, a platform that simplifies car maintenance by providing a 'virtual garage' offering an end-to-end experience for vehicle maintenance. Founded in London in 2017, it was acquired by Renault Group in December 2021 and began operations in France in mid-2022.

Logos

MOTRIO for the environment 
The MOTRIO brand is engaged in an ambitious programme to achieve zero CO2 emissions. By joining the Treedom project, the brand can offset 100 per cent of the carbon dioxide emissions produced by its participation in trade fairs.

Events and fairs 

MOTRIO participates in international trade fairs and events such as:

 2022 (dal 2011 al 2022) - Equip Auto Paris, France
 2022 - Automechanika Frankfurt, Germany
 2022 - Automechanika Istanbul, Turkey
 2022 - Autopromotec Bologna, Italy
 2022 - Motortec Madrid, Spain
 2022 - Salon de la Franchise Paris, France
 2021 (dal 2017 – 2021) - Colombia auto partes
 2018 - Russia MOTRIO show
 2018 - Motor Show Portugal
 2018 - MOTRIO Ireland Trade Fair
 2017 - Equipauto Algeria

Sport Sponsorship

Since 2005 MOTRIO has sponsored sporting events, car crews and drivers.

 2022 - Sponsor Copa de España Fútbol Sala
 2022 (2021 – 2022) - MOTRIO-Safir-Ganova – Cyclocross Team
 2022 (2015 -2022) - Trophy 4L crew sponsorship
 2022 - Sponsor Tour de l’Avenir
 2022 - Trophy Dacia Duster MOTRIO Cup
 2018 - Azores Rally: driver Gil Antunes' sponsorship
 2018 - MOTRIO Ireland Trade Fair
 2018 - Motor Show Portugal
 2018 - Russia MOTRIO show
 2017 - XXXV Rally Due Valli
 2017 - Colombia auto partes
 2016 - Brands Cup: sponsorship of driver Gabriel Casagrande
 2014 – Sponsor Spanish Football League
 2007 - Tour de France
 2005 - Tour de France

Awards 
In 2021 and 2022, MOTRIO won Allogarage's 'Meilleurs Garages de France' award, which ranks the best repair centres in France. On both occasions, the brand beats the competition by proving to be the car service network that most satisfies French customers.

During Autopromotec 2022, Renault Italia and its network (to which MOTRIO also belongs) were awarded the GIPA Trophy of Excellence in the 'OES Network Satisfaction' category for generalist brands, as it was recognised by Italian motorists as the service network that best met their expectations.

References

Automotive part retailers
Renault